The Canton of Notre-Dame-de-Bondeville is a canton situated in the Seine-Maritime département and in the Normandy region of northern France.

Geography 
An area of light industry, forestry and farming situated to the northwest of Rouen in the arrondissement of Rouen. The altitude varies from 8m (Roumare) to 169m (Houppeville) with an average altitude of 118m.

Composition 
At the French canton reorganisation which came into effect in March 2015, the canton was expanded from 9 to 24 communes (4 of which merged into the new commune Saint-Martin-de-l'If):

Carville-la-Folletière
Croix-Mare
Écalles-Alix
Émanville
Eslettes
Fresquiennes
Goupillières
Le Houlme
Houppeville
Limésy
Malaunay
Mesnil-Panneville
Montigny
Notre-Dame-de-Bondeville
Pavilly
Pissy-Pôville
Roumare
Sainte-Austreberthe
Saint-Jean-du-Cardonnay
Saint-Martin-de-l'If
La Vaupalière

Population

See also 
 Arrondissements of the Seine-Maritime department
 Cantons of the Seine-Maritime department
 Communes of the Seine-Maritime department

References

Notre-Dame-de-Bondeville